Prime Minister Bennett may refer to:
Naftali Bennett, 13th prime minister of Israel
R. B. Bennett, 11th prime minister of Canada